The 1973 ICF Canoe Sprint World Championships were held in Tampere, Finland.

The men's competition consisted of six Canadian (single paddle, open boat) and nine kayak events. Three events were held for the women, all in kayak.

This was the tenth championships in canoe sprint.

Medal summary

Men's

Canoe

Kayak

Women's

Kayak

Medals table

References

ICF medalists for Olympic and World Championships - Part 1: flatwater (now sprint): 1936-2007.
ICF medalists for Olympic and World Championships - Part 2: rest of flatwater (now sprint) and remaining canoeing disciplines: 1936-2007.

Icf Canoe Sprint World Championships, 1973
Icf Canoe Sprint World Championships, 1973
ICF Canoe Sprint World Championships
Sports competitions in Tampere
Canoeing
Canoeing and kayaking competitions in Finland